Vigrahapala was a 9th-century ruler of the Pala dynasty, in the Bengal region of the Indian subcontinent. He was the sixth Pala emperor. He reigned for a brief period before becoming an ascetic. Vigrahapala was a grandson of Dharmapala's younger brother Vakapala and son of Jayapala. He was succeeded by his son, Narayanapala.

Ancestry 
Previously, the historians believed that Shurapala and Vigrahapala were the two names of the same person. However, the discovery of a copper plate in 1970 in the Mirzapur district conclusively established that these two were cousins. They either ruled simultaneously (perhaps over different territories) or in rapid succession. If they ruled in succession, it seems more likely that Shurapala preceded Vigrahapala, since Vigrahapala I and his descendants ruled in unbroken succession. Vigrahapala either dethroned Shurapala, or replaced him peacefully in absence of any direct heir to the throne.

The information about him and his ancestors is found in the Bhagalpur copper-plate inscription of his son, Narayanapala.

Reign 

Based on the different interpretations of the various epigraphs and historical records, the different historians estimate Vigrahapala's reign as follows:

Vigrahapala was of peaceful disposition, and abdicated the throne in favour of his son Narayanpala.

See also
List of rulers of Bengal

References

Pala kings
Year of birth unknown
Year of death unknown